1,4-Dioxene is an organic compound with the formula (CH)(CH)O. The compound is derived from dioxane by dehydrogenation.  It is a colourless liquid.

References

Ethers
Dioxanes